Lielstraupe Castle is a castle in Straupe Parish, Cēsis Municipality, in the Vidzeme region of Latvia. It was originally built in the 13th century, and the village of Straupe began to develop around the castle in the 14th century. A large tower was added around 1600. Severely damaged by fire in 1905, the castle was restored between 1906 and 1909 by architect Vilhelms Bokslafs. Between 1963 and 2018 it housed a drug addiction rehabilitation hospital.

History 

City was first established as residence of Archbishopric of Riga. The date indicated above the roof of the gate (1263) is considered the year of its construction.

Around 1600, a tower was erected.

From the second half of the 13th century until 1625, the castle belonged to the baron family Rosen. During the Polish rule, a catholic monastery was located in the castle.

Since 1723, the castle belonged to the governor Peter Lacy, then the governor-general George Browne.

In 1866, the castle was acquired by General Baron Johann Gustav von Rosen (1797–1872) and again remained the property of the Rosen family until departure Hans von Rosen to Germany in 1939.

Seriously damaged by fire in 1905, the castle was restored in 1906-1909 by the architect Wilhelm Bockslaff.

Gradually, a modern village Straupe was formed near the castle.

In the years Soviet power, from 1949 to 1959, a machine-tractor station was housed in the castle. At this time, there were also equipped training rooms, workshops and a hostel for tractor drivers. Between 1963 and 2018 a narcological hospital was located in the castle. From the interiors there are oak stairs, door leaves and parquet, as well as beautiful tiled stoves built in the early twentieth century. On the wall of the tower of the castle that faces the inner courtyard there is a clock made of wooden details.

Castle Park 

The castle is surrounded by a park with a pond. Local and exotic trees such as Jasmine, Abies balsamea are growing in the park. In the farthest corner of the park, there is a peculiar separate wood bell tower that was built in 1848. The place where the park is now extending in the 14th century since 1374 there was the city of Straupe in accordance with the Riga Law and also being a member of Hanseatic League. However in 17th century city was destroyed and was never restored.

There is also a medieval cemetery in the park, which was the oldest cemetery in the town of Straupe. Victims of the plague epidemic of the 16th century has been buried in this cemetery. Plague devastated city of Straupe which lost 81.5% of the population and only 794 city inhabitants survived. The deceased buried the deceased until 1775, with the exception of the city barons and the city pastor who were buried in the church. Now the baron's gravestones can be seen in the church garden.

See also
List of castles in Latvia

References

External links
 
  Lielstraupe Castle

Castles in Latvia
Castles of the Teutonic Knights
Kreis Wolmar
Populated places established in the 1260s
1263 establishments in Europe
Cēsis Municipality
Vidzeme